Bilateral relations exist between the People's Republic of China and the Bahamas. Diplomatic relations were established on May 23, 1997. Less than two months later, the Chinese government opened up an embassy in Nassau, on the island of New Providence. The government of The Bahamas has not established an embassy in Beijing, although in 1999 Dr. Arthur Foulkes was appointed the first non-resident ambassador. Prime Minister Hubert Ingraham became the first Bahamian head of government to visit China in 1997.

Economic relations
In 2002 trade volume between the countries totalled some $62.93 million, with China exporting all but $60,000 of that.

See also
 Foreign relations of the Bahamas 
 Foreign relations of China

References

 
Bilateral relations of China
China